The year 645 BC was a year of the pre-Julian Roman calendar. In the Roman Empire, it was known as year 109 Ab urbe condita . The denomination 645 BC for this year has been used since the early medieval period, when the Anno Domini calendar era became the prevalent method in Europe for naming years.

Events
 The Spring and Autumn Annals, a Chinese book of records, mentions that on December 24 of this year there were five meteors in the sky. It was the first Chinese observation of meteors.

Births

Deaths
 Guan Zhong, prime minister of Qi
 Archilochos, Greek poet

References